Manakamana is a former village development committee in Gorkha District in the Gandaki Zone of northern-central Nepal. At the time of the 1991 Nepal census it had a population of 5,083 and had 889 houses in the town.

See also
Manakamana

References

Populated places in Gorkha District